Tommi Antero Mäkinen (born 26 June 1964) is a Finnish racing executive and former driver.

Mäkinen is one of the most successful WRC drivers of all time, ranking fifth in rally wins (24) and third in championships (4), tied with Juha Kankkunen behind Sébastien Ogier (8) and Sébastien Loeb (9). In 2018, as a head of Toyota Gazoo Racing WRT, he became the first person in the history of rally driving to win a Championship both as a driver and as a team principal.

He is a four-time World Rally Champion, a series he first won, and then successfully defended, continuously throughout 1996, 1997, 1998 and 1999, on all occasions driving the Ralliart Mitsubishi Lancer Evolution. He also aided Mitsubishi to the 1998 world constructors' title as well as winning the 2000 Race of Champions. Mäkinen's navigators include compatriots Seppo Harjanne, Kaj Lindström and Risto Mannisenmäki, the former retiring from alongside Mäkinen having previously served 1985 champion, and fellow "Flying Finn", Peugeot's Timo Salonen.

Career

Mäkinen won the Group N Finnish Rally Championship driving a Lancia Delta HF 4WD in 1988. Mäkinen's first world rally win came on the 1994 1000 Lakes Rally (now Rally Finland), in a Ford Escort RS Cosworth. Mäkinen proved a late developer by the standards of some in rallying circles, only nabbing his first full-time manufacturer seat in a Group A formula Mitsubishi Lancer Evolution alongside former Group A rally champion Swede Kenneth Eriksson, in 1995 - but success was to prove spontaneous thereafter.

A cultured Safari Rally win in 1996 proved the platform on which to build a dominant championship lead, which he consolidated by taking the title in Australia, away from runner-up, Subaru's Colin McRae - a long-time rival. He proceeded to win every drivers' title for Mitsubishi from 1996 to 1999. The Mitsubishi team, with the Finn and young Briton Richard Burns among its driver personnel, also won its sole manufacturers' championship in 1998, while late that same year, the licensed Tommi Mäkinen Rally video game was also released. In 2000, despite opening his campaign with victory on the January Monte Carlo Rally, Mäkinen finally relinquished his grasp on the title, being beaten in the standings by new title holder and fellow Finn, Marcus Grönholm. That year Mitsubishi produced a 'Tommi Mäkinen edition' of the road version of the Lancer Evolution VI to commemorate his previous title successes. This car had a different front bumper than the regular Evolution VI, while some models also featured a red and white paint job to closely resemble Mäkinen's rally car.

Mäkinen remained with Mitsubishi until the end of the 2001 season, having finished third in that year's standings behind Burns and McRae, by now respectively drivers for Subaru and Ford - but not before the inauspicious introduction of team's first ever World Rally Car on the San Remo Rally. Mäkinen and teammate Freddy Loix struggled with the car before the Finn's crash on the mountainside roads of the following round in Corsica was responsible for breaking co-driver Mannisenmäki's back and in doing so, virtually ended his top-line career. The Finn was forced to fare with substitute co-drivers for the remaining events in Australia (with Timo Hantunen) and Great Britain, the latter of which he retired from, helping Burns to claim the championship.

A move to the Prodrive-run Subaru World Rally Team for 2002 as replacement for Burns (who had chosen to drive a works Peugeot 206 WRC alongside Grönholm for his title defence) yielded one more, final career victory, on the 2002 Monte Carlo Rally where a technical infringement committed by on-the-road winner, and emerging talent, Sébastien Loeb, allowed Mäkinen to upstage the Frenchman. But his form then took a dive and he was not to add again to his tally of world titles.

He retired from the sport after the 2003 season, ending his WRC career on the podium with third place on that seasons final rally, Rally Great Britain.

In 2004 he established his own company named Tommi Mäkinen Racing Oy Ltd with the aim to prepare rally cars and provide support to  drivers.

In 2016, Mäkinen became the team principal of the Toyota Gazoo Racing, which is the factory team of Toyota and competes in the World Rally Championship (WRC). In 2018, the team managed to win the World  Rally Championship earning Toyota their first manufacturers' title since 1999.

Personal life
Mäkinen was born in Puuppola, near Jyväskylä, Finland. From 1999, he has lived in both Monaco and Jyväskylä. He is married, with two children.

WRC victories
{|class="wikitable"
! Number
! Event
! Season
! Co-driver
! Car
|-
| 1
|  44th 1000 Lakes Rally
| 1994
| Seppo Harjanne
| Ford Escort RS Cosworth
|-
| 2
|  45th International Swedish Rally
| 1996
| Seppo Harjanne
| Mitsubishi Lancer Evo 3
|-
| 3
|  44th Safari Rally Kenya
| 1996
| Seppo Harjanne
| Mitsubishi Lancer Evo 3
|-
| 4
|  16º Rally Argentina
| 1996
| Seppo Harjanne
| Mitsubishi Lancer Evo 3
|-
| 5
|  46th Neste 1000 Lakes Rally
| 1996
| Seppo Harjanne
| Mitsubishi Lancer Evo 3
|-
| 6
|  9th API Rally Australia
| 1996
| Seppo Harjanne
| Mitsubishi Lancer Evo 3
|-
| 7
|  30º TAP Rallye de Portugal
| 1997
| Seppo Harjanne
| Mitsubishi Lancer Evo 4
|-
| 8
|  33º Rallye Catalunya-Costa Brava (Rallye de España)
| 1997
| Seppo Harjanne
| Mitsubishi Lancer Evo 4
|-
| 9
|  17º Rally Argentina
| 1997
| Seppo Harjanne
| Mitsubishi Lancer Evo 4
|-
| 10
|  47th Neste Rally Finland
| 1997
| Seppo Harjanne
| Mitsubishi Lancer Evo 4
|-
| 11
|  47th International Swedish Rally
| 1998
| Risto Mannisenmäki
| Mitsubishi Lancer Evo 4
|-
| 12
|  18º Rally Argentina
| 1998
| Risto Mannisenmäki
| Mitsubishi Lancer Evo 5
|-
| 13
|  48th Neste Rally Finland
| 1998
| Risto Mannisenmäki
| Mitsubishi Lancer Evo 5
|-
| 14
|  40º Rallye Sanremo - Rallye d'Italia
| 1998
| Risto Mannisenmäki
| Mitsubishi Lancer Evo 5
|-
| 15
|  11th API Rally Australia
| 1998
| Risto Mannisenmäki
| Mitsubishi Lancer Evo 5
|-
| 16
|  67ème Rallye Automobile de Monte-Carlo
| 1999
| Risto Mannisenmäki
| Mitsubishi Lancer Evo 6
|-
| 17
|  48th International Swedish Rally
| 1999
| Risto Mannisenmäki
| Mitsubishi Lancer Evo 6
|-
| 18
|  29th Rally New Zealand
| 1999
| Risto Mannisenmäki
| Mitsubishi Lancer Evo 6
|-
| 19
|  41º Rallye Sanremo - Rallye d'Italia
| 1999
| Risto Mannisenmäki
| Mitsubishi Lancer Evo 6
|-
| 20
|  68ème Rallye Automobile de Monte-Carlo
| 2000
| Risto Mannisenmäki
| Mitsubishi Lancer Evo 6
|-
| 21
|  69ème Rallye Automobile de Monte-Carlo
| 2001
| Risto Mannisenmäki
| Mitsubishi Lancer Evo 6.5
|-
| 22
|  35º TAP Rallye de Portugal
| 2001
| Risto Mannisenmäki
| Mitsubishi Lancer Evo 6.5
|-
| 23
|  49th Safari Rally Kenya
| 2001
| Risto Mannisenmäki
| Mitsubishi Lancer Evo 6.5
|-
| 24
|  70ème Rallye Automobile de Monte-Carlo
| 2002
| Kaj Lindström
| Subaru Impreza WRC2001
|}

WRC results

WRC summary

See also 
International Rally Championship

References

External links

Tommi Mäkinen Racing Ltd.
Toyota Gazoo Razing

1964 births
Living people
Finnish racing drivers
Finnish rally drivers
World Rally Champions
World Rally Championship drivers
World Rally Championship people
Finnish expatriates in Monaco
Nismo drivers